Andy "A.C." Christell (born 14 June 1964 in Stockholm, Sweden) is a Swedish bass guitarist. He is known for playing in glam rock outfit Electric Boys and is the current bassist for Hanoi Rocks. He is a very close friend of Conny Bloom's and they two played together growing up. Christell was recruited into Hanoi Rocks in 2004, shortly after Bloom. Although he had considered giving up the bass prior to this, Bloom and Andy McCoy (another former bandmate), were able to persuade him otherwise. Christell has been described as a "polite quiet guy". His greatest passion to collecting Ed Wood and Vincent Price DVDs.He is also noticeable due to his long red ponytail.

References

Living people
Hanoi Rocks members
Swedish heavy metal bass guitarists
Musicians from Stockholm
1964 births
Electric Boys members